is a passenger railway station in the city of Kiryū, Gunma, Japan, operated by the private railway operator Jōmō Electric Railway Company.

Lines

Station layout
Niisato Station has two opposed side platforms connected by a level crossing.

Platforms

Adjacent stations

History
It was renamed to its present name on May 1, 1948. A new station building was completed on March 27, 1998.

Passenger statistics
In fiscal 2019, the station was used by an average of 371 passengers daily (boarding passengers only).

Surrounding area
Niisato Post Office

See also
 List of railway stations in Japan

References

External links

  
	

Stations of Jōmō Electric Railway
Railway stations in Gunma Prefecture
Railway stations in Japan opened in 1928
Kiryū, Gunma